Stumbo may refer to:
Stumbo the Giant, comics character
Greg Stumbo (born 1951), US politician
Stumbo (song), a 1986 single by Wiseblood